Ruth Topalian (February 9, 1927 – September 24, 2010) was an American gymnast. She competed in seven events at the 1952 Summer Olympics.

References

External links
 

1927 births
2010 deaths
American female artistic gymnasts
Olympic gymnasts of the United States
Gymnasts at the 1952 Summer Olympics
Sportspeople from New York City
21st-century American women